Jonathan Wrate (born 12 February 1985), known professionally as Blade Brown is a British rapper and songwriter from Battersea, London. He released the  mixtape series Bags and Boxes, and the Financial Times mixtapes. XXL has compared his style to that of early Young Jeezy and Gucci Mane.

Biography

Early life and career beginnings (1985–2006)
Wrate was born on 12 February 1985 in Streatham, later moving to Battersea. He is a supporter of Manchester United F.C. He was first exposed to hip hop through his father who would listen to 80s and 90s hip hop as well as reggae at home, all of which influenced Wrate to take an interest in music and start rapping more seriously around the age of 17. He released his debut mixtape entitled Nothing Long Volume 1 under Defenders Entertainment in 2004, but he took a break from music following a spell of both underground and commercial success through the mixtape which was played on mainstream radio stations such as Choice FM, BBC Radio 1Xtra and Kiss FM, as well as street DVDs in circulation at the time such as Streetz Incarcerated, Streetz Is Raw and Welcome to the City. Between 2005 and 2006 he recorded material for a second mixtape, which was initially entitled Nothing Long Volume 2, but it was never released due to the legal troubles Wrate was experiencing at the time, as well as a change in his own preferences as he has stated that he did not want to release many of the songs he had recorded.

Hollow Meets Blade with Giggs (2007)
Wrate released his second mixtape entitled Hollow Meetz Blade which was a collaboration with fellow South London rapper Giggs. The mixtape received general acclaim from both underground and mainstream rap fans in the United Kingdom. However, Wrate failed to capitalise on the hype from the mixtape and took a break from music shortly after its release.

Discography

Collaborative mixtapes

Mixtapes

Other charted songs

Awards and nominations

References

1985 births
Living people
Black British male rappers
English hip hop musicians
English male rappers
Gangsta rappers
People from Battersea
People from Streatham
Rappers from London